Safari Disco Club is the second studio album by French electropop band Yelle. It was released on 14 March 2011 by Barclay Records. The album was promoted by the singles "Safari Disco Club", "Que veux-tu" and "Comme un enfant".

Promotion
The first single, "Safari Disco Club", was released on 10 January 2011, with a music video directed by Jérémie Saindon following on 1 March 2011.

Tour
Yelle supported Katy Perry on the UK leg of her California Dreams Tour, beginning on 17 March 2011. Yelle also toured Europe, North America, South American, Asia and Oceania in support of Safari Disco Club.

Track listing

Notes
  signifies an additional producer

Personnel
Credits adapted from the liner notes of Safari Disco Club.

Yelle
 Julie Budet (a.k.a. Yelle) – vocals
 Jean-François Perrier (a.k.a. Grand Marnier) – keyboards, drums, guitar, programming
 Tanguy Destable (a.k.a. Tepr) – keyboards, drums, guitar, programming

Technical
 Jean-François Perrier – production ; additional production ; recording, mixing 
 Tanguy Destable – additional production ; production ; recording 
 Moritz Friedrich (a.k.a. Siriusmo) – production, recording 
 Olivier Le Brouder – recording ; mixing 
 Mike Marsh – mastering

Artwork
 Grégoire Alexandre – photographies
 Leslie David – graphic design

Charts

Release history

References

2011 albums
Barclay (record label) albums
Yelle albums